is a railway station in the town of Oguni, Yamagata Prefecture, Japan, operated by East Japan Railway Company (JR East).

Lines
Uzen-Numazawa Station is served by the Yonesaka Line, and is located 43.9 rail kilometers from the terminus of the line at Yonezawa Station.

Station layout
The station has one side platform serving a single bi-directional track. The station is unattended.

History
Uzen-Numazawa Station opened on November 10, 1933. The current station building dates from 1984. The station was absorbed into the JR East network upon the privatization of JNR on 1 April 1987.

Surrounding area

See also
List of Railway Stations in Japan

External links

  JR East Station information 

Railway stations in Yamagata Prefecture
Yonesaka Line
Railway stations in Japan opened in 1933
Stations of East Japan Railway Company
Oguni, Yamagata